This page, one list of hereditary baronies, lists all baronies, extant, extinct, dormant, abeyant, or forfeit, in the Peerage of Ireland.



See also
List of baronies in the Peerage of England
List of lordships of Parliament (for Scotland)
List of baronies in the Peerage of Great Britain
List of hereditary baronies in the Peerage of the United Kingdom

References

Ireland
Lists of nobility
Ireland-related lists